The Town of Scott is located in Monroe County, Wisconsin, United States. The population was 117 at the 2000 census. The unincorporated community of Norway Ridge is located in the town.

Geography
According to the United States Census Bureau, the town has a total area of 36.5 square miles (94.7 km2), of which, 33.9 square miles (87.9 km2) of it is land and 2.6 square miles (6.8 km2) of it (7.17%) is water.

Demographics
As of the census of 2000, there were 117 people, 41 households, and 30 families residing in the town. The population density was 3.4 people per square mile (1.3/km2). There were 61 housing units at an average density of 1.8 per square mile (0.7/km2). The racial makeup of the town was 94.02% White, 3.42% African American and 2.56% Native American.

There were 41 households, out of which 31.7% had children under the age of 18 living with them, 65.9% were married couples living together, 2.4% had a female householder with no husband present, and 26.8% were non-families. 19.5% of all households were made up of individuals, and 9.8% had someone living alone who was 65 years of age or older. The average household size was 2.85 and the average family size was 3.37.

In the town, the population was spread out, with 29.1% under the age of 18, 8.5% from 18 to 24, 26.5% from 25 to 44, 23.1% from 45 to 64, and 12.8% who were 65 years of age or older. The median age was 37 years. For every 100 females, there were 98.3 males. For every 100 females age 18 and over, there were 97.6 males.

The median income for a household in the town was $25,313, and the median income for a family was $27,188. Males had a median income of $21,250 versus $20,625 for females. The per capita income for the town was $11,498. There were 9.7% of families and 12.2% of the population living below the poverty line, including 5.4% of under eighteens and 50.0% of those over 64.

See also
 List of towns in Wisconsin

References

External links

Towns in Monroe County, Wisconsin
Towns in Wisconsin